C/1769 P1 (Messier) is a long-period comet that was visible to the naked eye at its last apparition in 1769. The comet is classified as a great comet due to its superlative brightness.

Discovery and observations
At the Naval Observatory in Paris, late in the evening of 8 August 1769 Charles Messier in his routine telescope search for comets saw a small nebulosity just above the horizon in the constellation Aries. On the next evening he saw the nebulosity by unassisted eye and confirmed it to be a comet due to its motion in the sky. On August 15 Messier estimated the length of the comet's tail to be 6°. Giovanni Domenico Maraldi and César François Cassini de Thury saw the comet for the first time on August 22 by telescope and later by unassisted eye. Chinese observers reported a “broom star” appearing on August 24 in the southeastern sky. Jean François Marie de Surville observed the comet in the pre-dawn of August 26 from a ship off the Philippines and reported the comet as having a tail but not bright.

According to observers, throughout the month of August the comet became brighter with a lengthening tail. On August 28 Eustachio Zanotti in Bologna and Messier observed a tail length of about 15°. Captain James Cook aboard the Endeavour in the South Pacific saw the comet for the first time on the pre-dawn of August 30 and measured the tail at 42°. On the 31st of August, Maraldi and Cassini measured the tail at 18°, perhaps because their local atmospheric conditions were less favorable than Captain Cook's.

Toward the end of August the comet was observed from many ships, but the reports added little of value to the land-based observations. On September 3 Messier observed a tail length of 36° and on September 5 a tail length of 43°; he reported that the tail was slightly curved and the head appeared reddish. On the following nights, the tail displayed bright parallel rays. The tail became even longer and on September 9 Messier measured a tail length of 55°.

By September 10 when the comet made its closest approach to Earth, Messier observed a tail length of up to 60°. On September 11 Alexandre Guy Pingré on a ship between Teneriffa and Cádiz estimated a tail length over 90°; however, only the tail's first 40° nearest the head were very bright, while the end of the tail was very dim. According to Messier, the maximum tail length measured for the comet was 97° at Île Bourbon by de la Nux.

In September the comet became more difficult to see and the visibility of the tail dwindled. On September 16 Messier saw the comet for the last time before its return after perihelion. Maraldi was able to see the comet in the evening twilight up to September 18.

In September Jérôme Lalande had calculated predictive orbital elements, which indicated that the perihelion would occur on October 7. Because of Lallende's predictions, astronomers began to search for the comet again around the middle of October. At Royal Greenwich Observatory Maskelyne's observations on October 23 revealed a short, broad and weakly visible tail. On October 24 Messier saw the comet in the evening sky with the unassisted eye but difficult to discern; by telescope he saw a bright nucleus with a tail about 2° degree. On October 25 Joseph-Louis Lagrange in Milan saw the comet with a dim tail, but a brighter nucleus than in September.

In November the comet became much dimmer although still followed by many observers, but only Messier made precise measurements. On November 17 the comet was very dim but the tail was still 1.5° long. After November 18 Messier could only see the comet by telescope. Chinese observers reported that by November 25 the “broom star” had completely disappeared. Messier and Maraldi saw the comet for the last time on December 1. On December 3 Pehr Wilhelm Wargentin became the last observer to report a sighting of the comet.

On September 22 the comet's brightness reached magnitude 0.

Possible cometary phase
According to J. Russell Hind there is some evidence that the comet C/1769 P1 exhibited a cometary phase similar to a lunar phase or planetary phase. Hind wrote concerning the 1769 comet:

Orbital calculations
Orbital elements for the comet were calculated by many astronomers, including Lalande, Giuseppe Asclepi, Cassini, Anders Johan Lexell, Leonhard Euler, Pingré, Adrien-Marie Legendre and Friedrich Wilhelm Bessel. Lexell, Asclepi, Pingré and Bessel were especially successful in calculating the comet's elliptic orbit.

Orbit
Using observations over 101 days in 1769, four decades later Bessel in 1810 calculated an orbit for the comet inclined about 41° to the ecliptic. At perihelion on 8 October 1769 the comet was about .123 AU from the Sun. On September 5 the comet was about .648 AU from Venus and on September 10 about .323 AU from Earth. On October 3 on its path away from the Sun, the comet came to within about .595 AU from Venus.

Napoleon’s Comet
Napoleon Bonaparte was born on 15 August 1769, one week after Messier's first sighting of the Great Comet of 1769. According to Käufl and Sterken:
Messier self-published a booklet (memoir) near the end of his life, connecting the comet's discovery to the birth of Napoleon. According to Meyer:
The Great Comet of 1811 was interpreted by many in 1812 and later as a portent of Napoleon's invasion of Russia and is also often called Napoleon's Comet. The great comets that occurred during Napoleon's lifetime were those of 1769, 1771, 1783, 1807, 1811, and 1819 (and possibly other years depending upon the definition of “great comet”).

References

External links
 Giovanni Maria Caglieris: La cometa del 1769 e Messier (Italian)
 Felice Stoppa: www.atlascoelestis.com (Italian)
 C/1769 P1 (Messier) – two maps, astrobril.nl maintained by Henk Bril

Non-periodic comets
1769 in science
17690808
Great comets